Adrian Ucchino (born 4 October 1991) is an Australian footballer who currently plays as a midfielder for APIA Leichhardt Tigers in the NSW NPL Men's 1.

Club career 
Ucchino was introduced to soccer by his childhood friend, taught him how to dribble, shoot and how to handle the ball. Ucchino was a fast learner and earned a reputation for his skill and ball handling.

On 27 October 2010, Ucchino made his debut for Frosinone against Reggina in the Coppa Italia.

In January 2011, Ucchino joined Sangiovannese on loan for the rest of the season.

In May 2012 Ucchino made his debut for New South Wales Premier League side Bonnyrigg White Eagles as a half-time substitute.

In 2015 Ucchino moved to rival NSW NPL Men's 1 rivals APIA Leichhardt Tigers FC.

Ucchino scored the winning goal in the 2019 NPL NSW Grand Final for Apia, to defeat Sydney United.

References

Frosinone Calcio players
Living people
1991 births
Australian soccer players
Expatriate footballers in Italy
Bonnyrigg White Eagles FC players
APIA Leichhardt FC players
National Premier Leagues players
Association football midfielders